Wells Fargo History may refer to:

 The History of Wells Fargo
 The Wells Fargo History Museum